A troll doll (Danish: Gjøltrold) is a type of plastic doll with furry up-combed hair depicting a troll, also known as a Dam doll after their creator Danish woodcutter Thomas Dam. The inspiration came from trolls in old Scandinavian folklore. The toys are also known as good luck trolls, or gonk trolls in the United Kingdom.

The dolls were first created in the late 1950's, and introduced in 1959, before becoming one of the United States' biggest toy fads in the early 1960s. They became briefly popular again during the 1970s through the 1990s and were copied by several manufacturers under different names. During the 1990s, several video games and a video show were created based on troll dolls. In 2003, the Dam company restored the United States copyrights for this brand, stopping unlicensed production. In 2005, the Dam company licensed the brand to DIC Entertainment, who attempted to modernize the brand by creating a cartoon under the name Trollz, but only lasted one season.

In 2013, the brand was bought by DreamWorks Animation, with an animated feature film called Trolls being released in 2016 and a sequel released in 2020.

Toy history 
Troll dolls were created in 1959 by Danish fisherman and woodcutter Thomas Dam. Dam could not afford a Christmas gift for his young daughter Lila and carved the doll from his imagination. Other children in the Danish town of Gjøl saw the doll and wanted one. Dam's company Dam Things began producing the dolls in plastic under the name Good Luck Trolls. It became popular in several European countries during the early 1960s, shortly before they were introduced in the United States. They became one of the United States' biggest toy fads from the autumn of 1963 to 1965. The originals were of the highest quality, also called Dam dolls and featuring sheep wool hair and glass eyes. Their sudden popularity, along with an error in the copyright notice of Thomas Dam's original product, resulted in cheaper imitations.

The Dam company never stopped its production of trolls in Denmark, where they were always a popular item. In the late 1980s, the Dam trolls started making another comeback in North America. E.F.S. Marketing Associates, Inc. was one of the few corporations granted permission to import and market the Thomas Dam trolls for resale in the United States. These Dam Trolls were marketed under the trade name of Norfin Trolls, with an "Adopt A Norfin Troll" logo on the tags.

During the period of popularity in the early to mid-1990s, several attempts were made to market the troll dolls to young boys. This included action figure lines such as The Original Battle Trolls from Hasbro, the Stone Protectors franchise, and Teenage Mutant Ninja Turtle Trolls. The popular Mighty Max line also had a series named Hairy Heads, also known as Dread Heads.

In 2003, the Dam copyright was restored by the Uruguay Round Agreements Act. The Uneeda Doll Company, a company that made millions of US dollars by manufacturing troll dolls in the U.S., challenged the restoration. The US Court of Appeals for the Second Circuit upheld the lower court's preliminary injunction, enjoining Uneeda from manufacturing, distributing, or selling "Wish-nik" troll dolls. The Toy Industry Association named troll dolls in its Century of Toys List, a list of the 100 most memorable and most creative toys of the 20th century.

In 2005, Dam licensed the trolls to DIC Entertainment as Trollz. With this, the campaign featured products such as fashion dolls and fashion accessories. The Trollz campaign was unsuccessful. 

In 2007, DIC sued the Dam company, claiming that they alleged claims of fraud in the inducement and negligent misrepresentation in connection with Dam's troll doll, and DIC's Trollz, which was created after DIC licensed the brand from Dam. Dam counter-sued DIC, claiming that the company financially misrepresented its ability to create and market a modern troll doll toy campaign and destroyed the image and goodwill of the doll.

In 2013, DreamWorks Animation acquired the intellectual property for the Trolls franchise from the Dam Family and Dam Things and became the exclusive worldwide licensor of the merchandise rights, except for Scandinavia, where Dam Things remains the licenser.

In entertainment

Television and film 
In 1991, Créativité & Développement released a cartoon special called The Magic Trolls And The Troll Warriors, that featured Trolls battling against King Nolaf and his Troll Warriors. The special promoted the Troll dolls under the Magic Trolls for girls and the Troll Warriors for boys. 

In 1992, DIC (who would later produce Trollz in 2005) released a half hour special called Super Trolls. The special featured three heroic trolls who fight an evil troll named Craven. The special was released on VHS by Buena Vista Home Video.

In that same year, a direct-to-video sing-along special was released titled The Trollies Radio Show, with puppet trolls singing somewhat dated hits such as "Kokomo", "Woolly Bully", and "Do Wah Diddy", as well as some original songs.

Also in the same year, GoodTimes Entertainment released a direct-to-video sing along series Treehouse Trolls. The two videos were Treehouse Trolls Forest of Fun and Wonder and Treehouse Trolls Birthday Day.

In 2005, DIC as part of a licensing campaign with Dam, they produced Trollz. A cartoon that featured five teenage girl trolls named after the gems on their belly buttons, who call themselves the “Best Friends for Life.”, with their names being Amethyst, Ruby, Sapphire, Topaz, and Onyx. They also use magic to help them throughout their everyday life, as well as living in a city within a magical world. 

In 2016, following DreamWorks’ purchase of the troll property, they produced Trolls. A 3D computer-animated musical comedy film based on the Troll dolls. The film was released on November 4, 2016. It was directed by Mike Mitchell and co-directed by Walt Dohrn, with Anna Kendrick and Justin Timberlake providing the voices of Poppy and Branch. A sequel, Trolls World Tour, was scheduled for theatrical release on April 10, 2020 in North America. The film was originally planned to be released theatrically in the United States on this day, but the film was released simultaneously in drive-in theaters, as regular movie theaters closed due to the restrictions caused by the COVID-19 pandemic, and through Premium VOD in the United States, Canada, United Kingdom, South Korea and Italy. This affected the number of projections and the box office performance of the film. As the pandemic receded, the film was released back in regular movie theaters.

Video games 
A platform video game simply titled Trolls was released in 1993 for Amiga, DOS, and Commodore 64. Other games released were Trolls on Treasure Island, a modified re-release of Dudes with Attitude and The Trolls in Crazyland, a localized version of Doki! Doki! Yūenchi: Crazy Land Daisakusen for the Nintendo Entertainment System, and Super Troll Islands for the Super Nintendo Entertainment System.

Pop culture references in other shows and movies 
In Disney/Pixar's Toy Story, 1, 2, and 3. Andy had a troll doll with a blue bikini with white flowers. Toy Story 3 also featured trolls in a toy train coach when Andy was playing with his toys and using his imagination, and featured trolls in Sunnyside Daycare.

In the Fox show The Simpsons, Bart Simpson was playing with a troll doll in church.

In another Fox show, King of the Hill, Bobby Hill had a collection of troll dolls in his bedroom.

In the Adult Swim show Robot Chicken, there featured a treasure troll going on a date and found out he had troll AIDS.

In the web series Annoying Orange, there featured three trolls who troll jokes to Orange, Pear, Midget Apple, and Marshmallow.

See also 
 Gonk

References

External links 
 
 Company website

 
1960s toys
1990s toys
Dolls
Trolls
Lucky symbols
Products introduced in 1959
1960s fads and trends
Trolls (franchise)